Security controls are safeguards or countermeasures to avoid, detect, counteract, or minimize security risks to physical property, information, computer systems, or other assets. In the field of information security, such controls protect the confidentiality, integrity and availability of information.

Systems of controls can be referred to as frameworks or standards. Frameworks can enable an organization to manage security controls across different types of assets with consistency.

Types of security controls
Security controls can be classified by various criteria. For example, controls are occasionally classified by when they act relative to a security breach:
Before the event, preventive controls are intended to prevent an incident from occurring e.g. by locking out unauthorized intruders;
During the event, detective controls are intended to identify and characterize an incident in progress e.g. by sounding the intruder alarm and alerting the security guards or police;
After the event, corrective controls are intended to limit the extent of any damage caused by the incident e.g. by recovering the organization to normal working status as efficiently as possible.

Security controls can also be classified according to their characteristics, for example:
Physical controls e.g. fences, doors, locks and fire extinguishers;
Procedural or administrative controls e.g. incident response processes, management oversight, security awareness and training;
Technical or logical controls e.g. user authentication (login) and logical access controls, antivirus software, firewalls;
Legal and regulatory or compliance controls e.g. privacy laws, policies and clauses.

For more information on security controls in computing, see Defense in depth (computing) and Information security

Information security standards and control frameworks
Numerous information security standards promote good security practices and define frameworks or systems to structure the analysis and design for managing information security controls.  Some of the most well known standards are outlined below.

International Standards Organization
ISO/IEC 27001 specifies 114 controls in 14 groups:
A.5: Information security policies
A.6: How information security is organised 
A.7: Human resources security - controls that are applied before, during, or after employment.
A.8: Asset management
A.9: Access controls and managing user access
A.10: Cryptographic technology
A.11: Physical security of the organisation's sites and equipment
A.12: Operational security
A.13: Secure communications and data transfer
A.14: Secure acquisition, development, and support of information systems
A.15: Security for suppliers and third parties
A.16: Incident management
A.17: Business continuity/disaster recovery (to the extent that it affects information security)
A.18: Compliance - with internal requirements, such as policies, and with external requirements, such as laws.'''

U.S. Federal Government information security standards
The Federal Information Processing Standards (FIPS) apply to all US government agencies.  However, certain national security systems, under the purview of the Committee on National Security Systems, are managed outside these standards.

Federal information Processing Standard 200 (FIPS 200), "Minimum Security Requirements for Federal Information and Information Systems," specifies the minimum security controls for federal information systems and the processes by which risk-based selection of security controls occurs.  The catalog of minimum security controls is found in NIST Special Publication SP 800-53.

FIPS 200 identifies 17 broad control families:

AC Access Control.
AT Awareness and Training.
AU Audit and Accountability.
CA Security Assessment and Authorization. (historical abbreviation)
CM Configuration Management.
CP Contingency Planning.
IA Identification and Authentication.
IR Incident Response.
MA Maintenance.
MP Media Protection.
PE Physical and Environmental Protection.
PL Planning.
PS Personnel Security.
RA Risk Assessment.
SA System and Services Acquisition.
SC System and Communications Protection.
SI System and Information Integrity.

National Institute of Standards and Technology

NIST Cybersecurity Framework 
A maturity based framework divided into five functional areas and approximately 100 individual controls in its "core."

NIST SP-800-53 
A database of nearly one thousand technical controls grouped into families and cross references.

 Starting with Revision 3 of 800-53, Program Management controls were identified.  These controls are independent of the system controls, but are necessary for an effective security program.
 Starting with Revision 4 of 800-53, eight families of privacy controls were identified to align the security controls with the privacy expectations of federal law.
 Starting with Revision 5 of 800-53, the controls also address data privacy as defined by the NIST Data Privacy Framework.

Commercial Control Sets

COBIT5
A proprietary control set published by ISACA.

 Governance of Enterprise IT
 Evaluate, Direct and Monitor (EDM) – 5 processes
 Management of Enterprise IT
 Align, Plan and Organise (APO) – 13 processes
 Build, Acquire and Implement (BAI) – 10 processes
 Deliver, Service and Support (DSS) – 6 processes
 Monitor, Evaluate and Assess (MEA) - 3 processes

CIS Controls (CIS 18) 
Formerly known as the SANS Critical Security Controls now officially called the CIS Critical Security Controls (COS Controls). The CIS Controls are divided into 18 controls.

 CIS Control 1: Inventory and Control of Enterprise Assets
 CIS Control 2: Inventory and Control of Software Assets
 CIS Control 3: Data Protection
 CIS Control 4: Secure Configuration of Enterprise Assets and Software
 CIS Control 5: Account Management
 CIS Control 6: Access Control Management
 CIS Control 7: Continuous Vulnerability Management
 CIS Control 8: Audit Log Management
 CIS Control 9: Email and Web Browser Protections
 CIS Control 10: Malware Defenses
 CIS Control 11: Data Recovery
 CIS Control 12: Network Infrastructure Management
 CIS Control 13: Network Monitoring and Defense
 CIS Control 14: Security Awareness and Skills Training
 CIS Control 15: Service Provider Management
 CIS Control 16: Application Software Security
 CIS Control 17: Incident Response Management
 CIS Control 18: Penetration Testing

The Controls are divided further into Implementation Groups (IGs) which are a recommended guidance to prioritize implementation of the CIS controls.

Telecommunications

In telecommunications, security controls are defined as security services as part of the OSI Reference model
 ITU-T X.800 Recommendation.
 ISO ISO 7498-2 
These are technically aligned. This model is widely recognized.

Data liability (legal, regulatory, compliance) 
The intersection of security risk and laws that set standards of care is where data liability are defined.  A handful of databases are emerging to help risk managers research laws that define liability at the country, province/state, and local levels. In these control sets, compliance with relevant laws are the actual risk mitigators.

 Perkins Coie Security Breach Notification Chart: A set of articles (one per state) that define data breach notification requirements among US states.
NCSL Security Breach Notification Laws: A list of US state statutes that define data breach notification requirements.
ts jurisdiction: A commercial cybersecurity research platform with coverage of 380+ US State & Federal laws that impact cybersecurity before and after a breach.  ts jurisdiction also maps to the NIST Cybersecurity Framework.

Business control frameworks 
There are a wide range of frameworks and standards looking at internal business, and inter-business controls, including:

SSAE 16
ISAE 3402
Payment Card Industry Data Security Standard
Health Insurance Portability and Accountability Act
COBIT 4/5
CIS Top-20
NIST Cybersecurity Framework

See also

 Access control
 Aviation security
 countermeasure
 Environmental design
 Information security
 OSI Reference Model
 Physical Security
 Risk
 Security
 Security engineering
 Security management
 Security services

References

External links 
NIST SP 800-53 Revision 4
DoD Instruction 8500.2
FISMApedia Terms

Computer network security
Computer security procedures
Data security